Scrivner is an unincorporated community in Cole County, in the U.S. state of Missouri.

History
A post office called Scrivner was established in 1898, and it remained operational until 1913. J. E. Scrivner, an early postmaster, gave the community his last name.

References

Unincorporated communities in Cole County, Missouri
Unincorporated communities in Missouri
Jefferson City metropolitan area